Ahmad Zahir (14 June 1946 – 14 June 1979) was an Afghan singer, songwriter and composer. Dubbed the "Elvis of Afghanistan", he is widely considered the all-time greatest singer of Afghanistan. The majority of his songs were sung in Farsi /Dari, and he also sang many songs in Pashto, as well as a few in Russian Urdu and English.

Born in Kabul, Zahir recorded at least 14 studio albums before his abrupt death on his 33rd birthday in 1979. His music blended folk music, Persian literature, Indian classical music and Western pop and rock styles. Among Afghans, he is considered an icon of Afghan music and is widely regarded as the single greatest musician of all time, posthumously reclaiming immortal fame due to his contributions and influence on music in Afghanistan. He has also become an icon of peacetime pre-war Afghanistan.

Early years 
Ahmad Zahir was born on 14 June 1946 (Jauza 24, 1325 of the Jalali calendar) in Kabul, Afghanistan to a Tajik/Pashtun family.
 His mother is a Tajik ethnic group from Badakhshan and his father, Abdul Zahir, was a royal court doctor who served as minister of health and Prime Minister of Afghanistan between 1971 and 1972. He was a speaker of the parliament and an influential figure in King Zahir Shah's era who helped write the 1964 Constitution of Afghanistan. Zahir had an older sister, Zahira Zahir, who would later be known as the hairdresser of U.S. President Ronald Reagan and others.

Career 
Zahir attended Habibia High School in Kabul and formed "the amateur band of Habibia High School" including Omar Sultan on guitar, Farid Zaland on congas, and Akbar Nayab on piano. Zahir played the accordion and sang. They played locally during celebratory occasions like Nowruz, Eid ul-Fitr, and Afghan Independence Day. Zahir gained considerable popularity in Kabul as a talented singer with a soulful voice.  His baritone chest voice and evocative singing gave him the title of "Bulbul-e- Habibya", "the Nightingale of Habibia".

He attended and graduated from Daru' l-Malimeen ("Teachers' College") in Kabul, and studied for two years in India to get a degree as an English instructor. After his return from India, Zahir got a job as a journalist for The Kabul Times, but soon began work on his first album. He worked closely with Afghan composers Nainawaz and Taranasaz. His first recorded song, "Gar Kuni Yak Nizara", was his own composition, blending Indian raga with western pop rhythms.

Zahir worked with mentors such as Ismail Azami (saxophonist), Nangalai (trumpeter), Abdullah Etemadi (drummer), and other musicians including Salim Sarmast, Nainawaz, Taranasaz and Mashour Jamal. He recorded over 22 albums in the 1970s. His songs were noted for their mellifluous tone, poetic style, compelling depth, and passionate emotional evocation. Zahir was on the scene of Afghan music for only 10 years at the most; yet, managed to record more than 30 albums. This was and is unique in any music industry around the world. All of these albums were successful and widely accepted (to this date) by everyone. The musicians managed to complete these recordings almost 40 years ago with almost no technology of today's world, and all was done in live recordings.

A controversy regarding the relation between his song "Tanha Shodam Tanha" and Claude Morgan's song "El Bimbo" (1974) exists. Some sources date the song and the album "Lylee" on which it appeared to 1971, which would make Morgan's version a cover, and some (mostly based on a previous version of this article) date it to 1977, reversing the relationship.

Because of his musical family background, Zahir helped to establish music as a more respected profession which in turn led to the founding of The Kabul Music School in 1974.

Following the Saur Revolution, Zahir criticized the leaders of the new communist regime in three songs in resistance to their oppression, modelling himself after one of his heroes, John Lennon, who used rock music for anti-war resistance in the west.

Musical style and contributions 

Of all the Afghan musicians, the person most closely associated with creating the distinct Afghan sound of music is Ahmad Zahir. After the great Afghan singer Sarban, Zahir played the most vital role in the development of the Afghan musical style. Highly educated, well-travelled, and an extraordinarily gifted musician, Zahir had an overwhelming passion for music and arts since his early childhood. He learned to play various musical instruments including the harmonium, guitar, and accordion (his favourite instrument) by the time he was 16 years old. His privileged and affluent background (his father, Abdul Zahir, was an ambassador, a minister, and later the Prime Minister of Afghanistan) gave him the opportunity to travel and become exposed to the burgeoning musical revolution of the 60s and 70s occurring in the United States, Europe, and India.  He was an avid listener of all genres of music and he incorporated elements of western (pop, rock, jazz), Indian, Middle Eastern (Arabic, Iranian), European (French and Italian belle chanson, Spanish Flamenco), and Afghan Folk in his songs.

Although the distinct Afghan sound (as opposed to the Indian classical, folkloric Afghan music, and western music) was created by the Persian singer Sarban in partnership with the legendary composer Salim Sarmast, Zahir was the one who popularized the sound and took it to the masses. Sarban's songs such as Ahesta Bero, Khorsheede Man, Ay Sarban, Mushjke Taza Mebartad, Dar Daaman-e-Sahra, are considered the pearls of Afghan Persian music. However, the sombre poetry, complex music & numerous other subtleties of these songs could be appreciated only by a minority of highly educated and erudite Afghans.  The songs were not popular items of entertainment for the consumption of the common man.  Ahmad Zahir simplified the lyrical, compositional, and orchestral aspects of Sarban and Sarmast's musical tradition. This does not mean he made the style simplistic, but that he made it accessible and thus hugely popular to the masses, especially the youth of Afghanistan.  For instance Zahir's song "Khoda Buwat Yaret" is a great example of an unmistakably Afghan musical sound.  The lyrics of the song are understandable by almost all Persian speakers regardless of their education and knowledge of Persian poetic tradition, yet the poeticism, imagery, and emotional impact is as powerful as the best of Sarban's songs. As a result of this accessibility of Ahmad Zahir's songs, the vast majority of future Afghan singers who sang in the unique Afghan style were influence primarily by Ahmad Zahir and not Sarban (whose songs few had heard). Thus, Zahir can truly be credited as the singer responsible for the realization of a unique and distinct Afghan musical language—separate from the Indian, Iranian, western, and folkloric musical traditions.

Zahir's debut album was recorded with Radio Kabul.  It is the first Afghan album that falls in the western genre of music, consisting mostly of pop songs.  However, although the rhythms, melody lines, and texture of songs were identifiably Afghan pop, there was a prominent Afghan (or rather eastern) element to them to—rather than use drums, Zahir opted for the tabla to hold the rhythm of the songs.  Zahir's favourite instrument, the accordion (a western albeit not pop instrument) heavily features in this album.  The most popular song of this album was "Az Ghamat Ay Nazanin."

However, it was Zahir's second album (also recorded with Radio Kabul) that not only shot him to superstardom, but was also hailed by critics as an artistic masterpiece.  The album has a distinctly Afghan sound, very much a continuation of the distinct Afghan style of music created by the singer Sarban and Salim Sarmast. However, unlike the music of the Sarban & Sarmast duo (which were highly erudite lyrically & complex musically), Zahir's album retains the main elements of the Afghan sound but with a very popular and easily accessible lyrical and musical language. Songs like Hama Yaranam, Rozo Shabam (which is a collaboration with the great Afghan singer Nashenas), Tanha tuyere, and Tora Afsoone Chashmanam were hugely popular due to their easily accessible lyrics (mainly to the youth) and a sound that suited the Afghan musical palate perfectly.

Other Zahir albums and songs mostly continue the musical style of this album with songs like Agar Bahar Beyayad, Laili Lail Jan, Khuda buwat Yaret. Zahir was one of the first Afghan musicians not to shy away from covering great songs of other artists. He considered covering music of other artists as paying homage to their artistic brilliance. He covered a playback of the famous Indian film Bobby (which was a hit in Afghanistan at the time), Iranian songs (Sultan-e Qalbha, Hargez Hargez, Hamash Dardo Hamash Ranjo), and even some of the greats of the west Enrico Macias, Elvis Presley. This versatility and willingness to adopt musical creations of others for his own performance, greatly enhanced the merit of his own musical creations.

Death 
Zahir died on 14 June 1979, on his 33rd birthday. It was reported in the media that he died in a car accident around the Salang Tunnel, but some claim he was assassinated as his political stance was at odds with the Marxist government of the time; supposedly he was lured out the city by a close friend and two female accomplices and subsequently murdered. Others believe that he was murdered on the order of senior politician Hafizullah Amin, due to an affair between Zahir and Amin's daughter, or ordered by Amin's trusted aide Daoud Taroon. A large crowd of mourners attended Zahir's funeral in Kabul, clogging the city streets and bringing daily activities to a halt.

He left behind a son, Rishad, from his first wife Najia with whom he eventually divorced.

Legacy
After his death, Zahir was considered a national hero. His tomb was destroyed by the Taliban in the late 1990s, but was later rebuilt by loving fans. It was renovated as recently as 2018 by fans who have established a foundation in his name in hopes of continuing his legacy.

His songs "Khuda Buwad Yaret", "Asman Khalist", "Agar Bahar Beyayad", "Laili Laili Jan", "Chashme Siya Dari", "Zim Zim (Kajaki Abroyet)" and many others, are known by the vast majority of Afghans. They are ranked as some of the greatest songs created in Afghanistan's musical history.

Zahir was listed as one of 50 golden voices in history who have made their mark internationally, according to National Public Radio (NPR).

The Academy Award-nominated American film director Sam French has been tapped in 2018 to direct a documentary film about Zahir's life.

Discography

Afghan music albums 
 Vol. 1 – Dilak am (1973)
 Vol. 2 – Bahar (1973)
 Vol. 3 – Shab ha ye zulmane (1974)
 Vol. 4 – Mother (1974)
 Vol. 5 – Awara (1975)
 Vol. 6 – Ghulam-e Qamar (1975)
 Vol. 7 – Sultan Qalbaam (1976)
 Vol. 8 – Az Ghamat Hy Nazaneen (1976)
 Vol. 9 – Gulbadaan (1971)
 Vol. 10 – Yaare Bewafa (1977)
 Vol. 11 – Lylee (1977) 
 Vol. 12 – Ahmad Zahir and Jila (1978)
 Vol. 13 – Ahange Zindagee (1978)
 Vol. 14 – Shab-e Hijraan (1979) (posthumous release)

Note: Audio cassette versions of many of Zahir's Afghan Music albums are missing some songs that are present on the original vinyl records.

Ariana music albums 
 Vol. 1 – Daard-e Dil (1972)
 Vol. 2 – Mosum-e Gul (1977)

Note: The original Ariana Music record albums contain many hidden tracks.

Music center albums 
 Vol. 1 – Ashiq rooyat Mon (1973)
 Vol. 2 – Neshe Gashdum (1976)
 Vol. 3 – Lylee Jaan (1977)
 Vol. 4 – Ahmad Zahir Ba Sitara Haa (1977)
 Vol. 5 – To Baamanee (1978)

Other discography information 
 He only recorded 2 music videos on Radio Kabul TV: "Laylee Jaan" in 1976 and "Khuda Buwat Yarret" in 1977.
 Zahir recorded several songs in Radio Kabul and Radio Afghanistan studios which later came out as albums. Eight of these albums have been released.

References

External links 
 Ahmad Zahir all albums, songs on SoundCloud
 SoundCloud.com/AhmadZaher
 Ahmad Zahir - the documentary film 
 "Afghan Elvis" segment on Radiolab

1946 births
1979 deaths
Pashtun singers
Afghan musicians
Afghan secularists
Afghan male singers
20th-century singers
Afghan revolutionaries
Afghan anti-communists
Persian-language singers
Afghan democracy activists
Habibia High School alumni
Assassinated Afghan people
20th-century Afghan male singers
Road incident deaths in Afghanistan